This is a list of the resident commissioners of the British Solomon Islands protectorate (1893–1975) and the dependent Solomon Islands (1975–1978).

Resident commissioners of the Solomon Islands Protectorate (1896–1953)
The resident commissioners were subordinate to the High Commissioner for the Western Pacific, the executive officer of the British Western Pacific Territories (BWPT) who was, until 3 July 1952, the Governor of Fiji.

Governors of the Solomon Islands (1953–1978) 
From 3 July 1952, Fiji (and Tonga) separated from the BWPT. A separate High Commissioner for the Western Pacific was appointed. The High Commissioner remained temporarily based in Fiji, but moved to Honiara, British Solomon Islands, at the end of 1952, and from 1 January 1953, the role was combined with that of the Governor of the Solomon Islands. On 1 January 1972, the Gilbert and Ellice Islands separated with their own governor. On 2 January 1976, after nearly all had been given separate statehood, the office of High Commissioner and the entity of the BWPT were abolished.

See also
 Governor-General of Solomon Islands 
 Prime Minister of Solomon Islands

References

External links
 Solomon Islands at Rulers.org

Colonial heads
Solomon Islands colonial heads

Solomon Islands